William Garrett Walden, known as W. G. Snuffy Walden (born February 13, 1950), is an American musician and composer of film and television soundtracks. Walden is an Emmy Award winner for the theme music to The West Wing (NBC), has been nominated for numerous Emmys throughout his career, and has received 26 BMI Awards.

Early life 
Walden was born in Louisiana on February 13, 1950, and raised in Houston, Texas. He graduated from Clear Creek High School in League City, Texas in 1967. In college he studied science and math, and he put himself through school working on a late-night radio show at KRBE in Houston and playing guitar in a strip club.

Walden's middle name was his mother's maiden name, and this was the origin of his nickname. Members of his mother's family had sometimes been called Snuffy after the Southern snuff manufacturer Levi Garrett. His family and schoolmates addressed him as Garrett, but Snuffy began to stick when he was away at summer camp and the name was preferred by fellow musicians as his career began.

Musical career 
In the late 1960s, Walden dropped out of school, quit his job, and devoted his energies to the guitar full-time, picking up a bass player (Al Roberts) and drummer (Randy Reeder) to form a three-piece band named Aphrodite. They started touring and wound up in Denver, playing local clubs and opening for acts like Buddy Miles. It was in Denver that Emerson, Lake & Palmer's manager, Neville Chesters, saw them in a club and offered them a recording contract with ELP's label, Manticore. In 1972, the group moved to England and was reformed, keeping Al Roberts and changing the name to Stray Dog. There, they were signed to Manticore and Greg Lake produced three songs from their first album Stray Dog. The new group toured with ELP as the opening act, but never really took flight, and eventually folded. Following the breakup of the band, Walden supplanted the ailing Paul Kossoff by providing guitar tracks for Free's final album Heartbreaker, which was released in 1973 (Walden plays on 'Common Mortal Man', 'Easy on My Soul' and 'Seven Angels'). He also played electric guitar in 1973, on the debut solo album Still by King Crimson lyricist, Peter Sinfield.  In 1975, he joined The Eric Burdon Band and performed with them for a year.

In 1975, Walden moved to Los Angeles and spent the rest of the decade performing as a solo artist and supporting artists such as Stevie Wonder, Donna Summer, Chaka Khan, and Eric Burdon. Notably, in 1975-6 he again filled in for Paul Kossoff as a session musician on Back Street Crawler's Second Street album. By the mid-1980s, television agents and producers became aware of Walden through his local performances in Santa Monica. When approached to score a new television show, Walden had mixed feelings but accepted the offer.
"I could see the handwriting on the wall for touring," he would later remember, "and it wasn't pretty. I kept envisioning Holiday Inn at age 60." The television show he was hired for was Thirtysomething, which turned out to be a major hit television series and dramatically altered Walden's music career.

Following his success as a touring and session musician and an Emmy nomination for the "Theme from Thirtysomething", Walden scored numerous television series, including The Wonder Years, Roseanne, Ellen, My So-Called Life, Felicity, Early Edition, Sports Night, The West Wing, George Lopez, I'll Fly Away, The Stand, Huff, Once and Again, Friday Night Lights and Studio 60 on the Sunset Strip.

In the summer of 2001, Walden released a solo album of mainly acoustic guitar pieces titled Music by... W. G. Snuffy Walden.  The album included expanded or full versions of many of Walden's themes, such as "Once and Again", "Eugene's Ragtop", "Thirtysomething (Revisited)", and "West Wing Suite".

In July 2002, Tom Guerra conducted a comprehensive interview of Walden for Vintage Guitar Magazine. In April 2008, Stephen J. Abramson interviewed Walden for a four-hour, multi-part video series for the Television Academy.

In March 2018, Up to Snuff, a documentary film about Walden's career, won the documentary competition in its premier at the Pasadena International Film Festival.

In September 2018, Walden starred in a 1950s style cover of Africa by Toto along with the musical collective Postmodern Jukebox on YouTube.

Awards and nominations

Emmys

Awards
 2000 Outstanding Main Title Theme Music – The West Wing

Nominations
 1988 Main Title, Theme Music – Thirtysomething
 1992 Main Title, Theme Music – I'll Fly Away 
 1994 Best Original Score – Stephen King's The Stand
 1995 Main Title Theme Music – My So-Called Life
 1997 Main Title Theme Music – Early Edition
 1997 Music Composition for a Series (Dramatic Underscore) – Early Edition
 2000 Music Composition for a Series (Dramatic Underscore) – Felicity 
 2001 Music Composition for a Series (Dramatic Underscore) – The West Wing
 2003 Outstanding Main Title Theme Music – Miracles
 2005 Outstanding Main Title Theme Music – Huff 
 2007 Music Composition for a Series (Dramatic Underscore) – Kidnapped

BMI Awards
 The Wonder Years (1988, 1989, 1990)
 The Jackie Thomas Show (1993)
 Ellen (1994, 1995)
 Roseanne (1994, 1995, 1996)
 The Drew Carey Show (1997, 1998, 1999, 2000, 2001)
 The Norm Show (1999)
 Richard Kirk Ward BMI Award for Outstanding Career Achievement (2001) 
 Providence (1999, 2000, 2002, 2003)
 The West Wing (2000, 2001, 2002, 2003, 2004, 2005)
 Men of a Certain Age (2010)

Discography

Solo albums
 Music by... W. G. Snuffy Walden (2001, Windham Hill Records)

Stray Dog albums
 Stray Dog (1973)
 Fasten Your Seat Belts (1973) 
 While You're Down There (1974)

Guest Appearances
 Rabbit (John "Rabbit" Bundrick) - Broken Arrows (1973, Island Records)
 Rabbit (John "Rabbit" Bundrick) - Dark Saloon (1974, Island Records)

Compilation albums
 Still (1973, Peter Sinfield - Command Studios)
 thirtysomething Soundtrack (1991, Geffen Records)
Babylon Minstrels (1992, Hollywood Records)
 The Stand (1994, ABC Circle Music)
 My So-Called Life Soundtrack (1995, Atlantic Records)
 A Winter's Solstice VI (1997, Windham Hill Records)
 Celtic Christmas III (1997, Windham Hill Records)
 The Carols Of Christmas II (1997, Windham Hill Records)
 Summer Solstice 2 (1998, Windham Hill Records)
 Sounds Of Wood & Steel (1998, Windham Hill Records)
 Celtic Christmas IV (1998, Windham Hill Records)
 Touch – Windham Hill 25 Years of Guitar (2001, Windham Hill Records)
 A Winter's Solstice, Vol. 1: Silver Anniversary Edition (2001, Windham Hill Records)
 A Windham Hill Christmas (2002, Windham Hill Records)
 Windham Hill Chill: Ambient Acoustic (2003, Windham Hill Records)
 Windham Hill Chill 2 (2003, Windham Hill Records)
 Friday Night Lights Vol. 2 (2010)
 The West Wing (2017, Varèse Sarabande)

Filmography

References

External links 
 W. G. Snuffy Walden Official Website

1950 births
Living people
Windham Hill Records artists
Musicians from Houston
Musicians from Louisiana
The West Wing
The Wonder Years
In Plain Sight
Friday Night Lights (TV series)
Nashville (2012 TV series)
American television composers